MSRV or MSRv may refer to:

 Multiple sclerosis retrovirus, a virus belonging to the Human Endogenous Retrovirus-W family
 Sentinel-class maritime security and response vessels, of the Navy of Singapore
 The bibcode abbreviation for the scientific journal Mass Spectrometry Reviews

See also
 MRSV (disambiguation)